Paratomoxia agathae is a species of beetle in the genus Paratomoxia of the family Mordellidae. It was described by Batten in 1990.

References

External links
Coleoptera. BugGuide.

Beetles described in 1990
Mordellidae